D. Page Elmore (May 31, 1939 – June 26, 2010) was a member of the Maryland House of Delegates. He had served from January 2003 until his death, representing district 38A which encompasses Somerset and Wicomico Counties. Elmore was also the chairman of the Eastern Shore Delegation.

Background
Born in 1939 in Nassawadox, Virginia, Elmore attended the University of Richmond. He was a retired businessman who was the owner and chief executive officer of Shore Disposal, Inc., of Maryland's Eastern Shore, from 1965 to 1998.

While living in Virginia, Elmore served as the Accomack County Treasurer from 1968 until 1976.

In the Legislature
Delegate Elmore had been a member of House of Delegates since January 8, 2003. He served on the House Ways and Means Committee and its revenue subcommittee. He was also the 2005 chair of the Maryland Rural Caucus.

Retirement and death
After initially filing to run for reelection, Elmore withdrew from the race in late June 2010 while spending several days in the hospital receiving treatment for a cracked vertebra he suffered the previous winter.

Elmore died on June 26, 2010, following a brief bout of cancer.

Election results
2006 Race for Maryland House of Delegates – District 38A
Voters to choose one:
{| class="wikitable"
!Name
!Votes
!Percent
!Outcome
|-
|-
|D. Page Elmore, Rep.
|8,030
|  63.3%
|   Won
|-
|-
|Patrick M. Armstrong, Dem.
|4,652
|  36.6%
|   Lost
|-
|Other Write-Ins
|6
|  0.1%
|   Lost
|}

2002 Race for Maryland House of Delegates – District 38A
Voters to choose one:
{| class="wikitable"
!Name
!Votes
!Percent
!Outcome
|-
|-
|D. Page Elmore, Rep.
|6,811
|  55.7%
|   Won
|-
|-
|Kirk G. Simpkins, Dem.
|5,396
|  42.2%
|   Lost
|-
|Other Write-Ins
|12
|  0.1%
|   Lost
|}

Notes

1939 births
2010 deaths
Republican Party members of the Maryland House of Delegates
Deaths from cancer in Maryland
Virginia Republicans
People from Nassawadox, Virginia
University of Richmond alumni
21st-century American politicians